Svetlana Kuznetsova and Martina Navratilova were the defending champions, but Kuznetsova decided not to compete this year. Navratilova teamed up with Lisa Raymond and lost in second round to Elena Likhovtseva and Anastasia Myskina.

Nadia Petrova and Meghann Shaughnessy won the title, defeating Virginia Ruano Pascual and Paola Suárez 2–6, 6–3, 6–3 in the final. It was the 8th title for Petrova and the 8th title for Shaughnessy in their respective careers. It was also the 4th title for the pair during this season.

Seeds
The first four seeds received a bye into the second round.

Draw

Finals

Top half

Bottom half

External links
 Main and Qualifying Draws

Women's Doubles
Italian Open - Doubles